Aphypena is a genus of moths of the family Noctuidae. The genus was erected by Charles Swinhoe in 1901.

Species
Aphypena exhibens Walker, [1863]
Aphypena violacea Holloway, 2005

References

Catocalinae